The 1995–96 Gonzaga Bulldogs men's basketball team represented Gonzaga University in the West Coast Conference (WCC) during the 1995–96 NCAA Division I men's basketball season. Led by fourteenth-year head coach Dan Fitzgerald, the Bulldogs were  overall in the regular season (10–4 in WCC, tied for first),

and played their home games on campus at the Charlotte Y. Martin Centre in Spokane, Washington.

In November 1995, athletic director Fitzgerald announced this season would be his penultimate as head coach, with plans to promote longtime assistant Dan Monson in the spring of 1997. 

Regular season co-champion, Gonzaga advanced to the final of the WCC tournament at Santa Clara, but fell to fifth seed Portland. Ten days later in the National Invitation Tournament (NIT), the Bulldogs traveled to south to Pullman and lost to Washington State by nineteen points to finish at

Postseason results

|-
!colspan=6 style=| WCC tournament

|-
!colspan=6 style=| National Invitation tournament

References

External links
Sports Reference – Gonzaga Bulldogs men's basketball – 1995–96 season

Gonzaga Bulldogs men's basketball seasons
Gonzaga
Gonzaga
1995 in sports in Washington (state)
1996 in sports in Washington (state)